The 1974 Southern Jaguars football team was an American football team that represented Southern University as a member of the Southwestern Athletic Conference (SWAC) during the 1974 NCAA Division II football season. Led by Charles Bates in his third season as head coach, the Jaguars compiled an overall record of 8–3 and a mark of 3–3 in conference play, placing fourth in the SWAC.

Schedule

References

Southern
Southern Jaguars football seasons
Southern Jaguars football